Pitsford Water or Pitsford Reservoir is a 413 hectare reservoir and biological Site of Special Scientific Interest east of Brixworth in Northamptonshire. It is owned by Anglian Water, which manages it as a water park for walking, cycling, fishing, sailing and birdwatching. An area of 181 hectares north of the causeway which divides the reservoir is the Pitsford Water Nature Reserve, which is managed by the Wildlife Trust for Bedfordshire, Cambridgeshire and Northamptonshire.

History and location
The reservoir was built in 1956 to supply  the town of Northampton, which is about 6 miles to the south. Holcot bridge was drowned when it filled and was replaced by a causeway a quarter mile further south. The water is the 34th largest in England and Wales, with a surface area of 2.85 square miles. The reservoir is near the village of Pitsford, from which it is named. It is also close to Brixworth village and Brixworth Country Park, with Holcot on its eastern side.

Ecology
This is the largest body of water in the county, and is used by wintering wildfowl, including the northern shoveler in nationally important numbers. Over 60 species of birds breed on the site, such as the great crested grebe, little grebe, teal, kingfisher and reed warbler.

Fishing 
The water is run as a trout fishery by Anglian Water, on a season ticket and day ticket basis, with boat hire available. Predator fishing is available in the winter months, mainly for pike. Trout are stocked at around 2lb in weight. The Pitsford Water brown trout record was set in October 2017 by season ticket holder Bob Collins with a fish of 15lb 8oz.

Access
There is public access to the water park, and a permit from the fishing lodge is required to visit the nature reserve.

References

Drinking water reservoirs in England
Reservoirs in Northamptonshire
Sites of Special Scientific Interest in Northamptonshire
Buildings and structures completed in 1956
Wildlife Trust for Bedfordshire, Cambridgeshire and Northamptonshire reserves